Iredalea adenensis is a species of sea snail, a marine gastropod mollusc in the family Drilliidae.

Description

Distribution
This marine species occurs in the Gulf of Aden.

References

 Morassi M. & Bonfitto A. (2013) Four new African turriform gastropods (Mollusca: Conoidea). Zootaxa 3710(3): 271–280

External links

adenensis
Gastropods described in 2013